Harvest Time Christian Academy is a coeducational, private Christian school located in Tyler, Texas. Founded in 2010 as a Christian ministry of the Harvest Time Church of Tyler, the school accepts students from Pre-K to 12th grade.

Academics 
HTCA uses the Accelerated Christian Education program. Each year, all students take the Stanford Achievement Test Series in order to assess academic achievement.

In addition to their regular course of study, students participate in many activities throughout the year including field trips, art classes, music lessons, chapel services, choral performances, and community service projects.

References

External links 
 

Private K-12 schools in Texas
Christian schools in Texas
Education in Tyler, Texas
Schools in Smith County, Texas